Muraenoclinus dorsalis, the nosestripe klipfish, is a species of clinid native to the Atlantic coast of southern Africa from Namibia to Natal, South Africa where it can be found in stony tide pools.  It is viviparous.  This species can reach a maximum length of  TL.  It is currently the only known member of its genus.

References

Clinidae
Fish described in 1859
Monotypic fish genera